The 2004 presidential campaign of Michael Badnarik, software engineer and candidate for the Texas legislature in 2000 and 2002, began on February 17, 2003, three months after starting an exploratory committee on November 17, 2002. He spent over a year traveling the country, totaling over 25,000 miles prior to the 2004 Libertarian National Convention. On the second night (May 29) of the Convention, he participated in a debate with the other Libertarian candidates, broadcast on C-SPAN.

The next day, the nomination for the Party began, with a candidate needing over 50% of the 778 votes cast. On the first ballot, Badnarik finished 2nd with 256 votes to Aaron Russo (film producer turned political activist who had outspent him 3 to 1 the month before) by two votes, while finishing 10 votes above Gary Nolan (former talk radio host), with none of them having over 50%.  On the 2nd ballot, Russo received 285 votes to Badnarik's 249, with Nolan at 244. Badnarik was endorsed by Nolan prior to the third round of voting between him and Russo. On the third ballot, he received 423 votes to Russo's 344, clinching the nomination with 54.4% of the votes cast. Richard Campagna (who had run for lieutenant governor of Iowa in 2002) was soon chosen as his running mate. After the victory, he stated, "If I can win the nomination, there's no reason I can't win this election."

The ticket gained ballot access in 48 states and in the District of Columbia, with write-in access in New Hampshire.

Endorsements
 Bob Barr, U.S. House of Representative from Georgia's 7th district (Barr would later run and win the nomination of the party four years later)
 Crispin Sartwell, American philosopher, self-professed individualist anarchist and journalist
 Jimmie Vaughan, musician
 Doug Stanhope, comedian
 Penn Jillette, entertainer, of Penn & Teller
 Aaron Russo, 2004 Libertarian Party Presidential candidate 
 Gary Nolan, 2004 Libertarian Party Presidential candidate
 Barry Hess, 2000 Libertarian Party Presidential candidate 
 Jo Jorgensen, academic; Libertarian nominee for President in 2020; Libertarian nominee for Vice President in 1996; Libertarian nominee for U.S. Representative from SC-04 in 1992
 James Bovard,
 Tim Cavanaugh,
 Nick Gillespie

Positions
Badnarik stated that he would oppose and veto any federal legislative attempt to prohibit gay marriage, while opposing federal control over abortion, an end to foreign interventionism, repeal of federal mandates and controls over schools and an end to the War on Drugs. He also supported the right to bear arms of the individual, along with opposing the renewal of the defense weapons ban. He also advocated to an end of all corporate welfare, such as subsidies to oil and timber companies.

Financing
The campaign raised $1 million by Election Day.

Campaign
Badnarik and Green Party candidate David Cobb were arrested in St. Louis, Missouri, on October 8, 2004, for an act of civil disobedience. Badnarik and Cobb were protesting their exclusion from the presidential debates of the 2004 presidential election campaign. They were arrested after crossing a police barricade in an attempt to serve an Order to Show Cause to the Commission on Presidential Debates.

Result
In the general election, Badnarik finished in 4th place, receiving 397,265 votes (0.3% of the electorate). This was 12,834 more votes than the Browne/Olivier ticket four years prior.

References

2004 United States presidential campaigns
Badnarik, Michael